Samuel Louis Joslin (born 18 January 2002) is a British film and television actor. He is best known for playing the role of Thomas Bennett in The Impossible and Jonathan Brown in Paddington and its sequel.

Career 
In 2012, Joslin got his first major role as Thomas Bennett in The Impossible, a true story about a family that survived the Indian Ocean tsunami on 26 December 2004. In 2014, Joslin starred along Lambert Wilson in the short film The Nostalgist.
The film focuses on the father (Wilson) and his unusual son (Joslin) in a future world. In the same year he got the part of  Jonathan Brown in the British movie Paddington. In 2015, Joslin played Marcus Maudsley in The Go-Between. In 2017, Joslin reprised his role as Jonathan Brown in Paddington 2.

Filmography

Film

Television

Awards and nominations

References

External links 
 

2002 births
Living people
21st-century English male actors
English male child actors
English male film actors
English male television actors
Male actors from London
People from Kensington